Hilde Volk (1912–1995) was an Austrian actress who worked extensively on stage and in radio. Later in her career she attained wider recognition for her co-starring role in the ARD crime television series Sun, Wine and Hard Nuts. She appeared alongside her husband Erik Ode.

Selected filmography
 Fruit Without Love (1956)
 Stefanie (1958)
 Ohne Mutter geht es nicht (1958)
 My Ninety Nine Brides (1958)
 What a Woman Dreams of in Springtime (1959)
 Wenn das mein großer Bruder wüßte (1959)
 The High Life (1960)
 Only a Woman (1962)
 Der Kommissar (1969-1976, TV series)
 Sun, Wine and Hard Nuts (1977-1981, TV series)

References

Bibliography
Hans-Michael Bock and Tim Bergfelder. The Concise Cinegraph: An Encyclopedia of German Cinema. Berghahn Books, 2009.

External links

1912 births
1995 deaths
Austrian film actresses
Austrian television actresses
Austrian stage actresses
Actresses from Vienna